Roberta Lawson (née Campbell, October 31, 1878, Alluwe, Indian Territory – December 31, 1940, Tulsa, Oklahoma) was a Lenape-Scots-Irish activist, community organizer, and musician. During World War I, she was the head of the Women's Division of the Oklahoma Council of Defense.  She was president of the Oklahoma State Federation of Women's Clubs, which organized to support community welfare and educational goals. As music chairman of the General Federation of Women's Clubs, in 1926 she wrote Indian Music Programs for clubs and special days of celebration. In 1935 she was elected president of the General Federation, and served a three-year term leading its two million members to work toward goals of "uniform marriage and divorce laws, birth control, and civic service."

Early life and education
Born Roberta E. Campbell, she was the daughter of Emeline Johhnycake, a Lenape and daughter of Charles Johnnycake, the last Lenape chief; and John Edward Campbell, of Scots-Irish descent from Virginia.  Her father had migrated to Oklahoma after the American Civil War and became a successful trader. Roberta learned from both sides of her family; she was tutored at home and later attended a seminary and Hardin College in Missouri.  From her mother and maternal grandfather Charles, she learned Lenape chants and music, which later inspired her own compositions.

Marriage and family
In 1901 she married Eugene Lawson (d. 1931), an attorney who had settled in Nowata, Indian Territory. He also worked in banking and the oil industry.  They had one son together, Edward Campbell Lawson, born in 1905. Later they moved to Tulsa, Oklahoma, where he founded an oil company.  After his father's death, the younger Lawson became president of their Tulsa-based Lawson Petroleum Company.

Civic career
Roberta Lawson became active in women's clubs, which were organizing to address social and community needs. In 1903 she became president of the Nowata Women's Club, and by 1917 was elected to a term to the Oklahoma State Federation of Women's Clubs.  The following year, she became active in the General Federation of Women's Clubs, where she held a number of offices, including music chairman.  During that time, she wrote compositions for Indian Music Programs for clubs, as well as for Special Music Days (1926).  While she served as president from 1935–1938, she led the General Federation's two million members in goals of "uniform marriage and divorce laws, birth control, and civic service."

Her local and regional leadership earned Lawson recognition and new challenges at a state and national level.  During World War I, she was appointed by the Oklahoma governor as head of the Women's Division of the Oklahoma Council of Defense.  During the Great Depression and the administration of President Franklin D. Roosevelt, Lawson was selected for Eleanor Roosevelt's National Committee for the Mobilization for Human Needs (1933–1934).

Lawson served as the director of the Oklahoma Historical Society, as a member of the Board of Regents for Oklahoma College for Women (now the University of Science and Arts of Oklahoma) in Chickasha, and as a member of the board of trustees of the University of Tulsa.  She also belonged to local music and women's clubs in Tulsa, and the city's First Presbyterian Church, as well as the Daughters of the American Revolution, a heritage organization.

Legacy and honors
1935, inducted into Oklahoma Women's Hall of Fame.
Lawson was one of the four women inducted into the American Indian Hall of Fame, and her bronze bust is included among the 41 displayed at Anadarko, Oklahoma.

Notes

External links
Linda D. Wilson. "Lawson, Roberta E. Campbell (1878-1940),", Encyclopedia of Oklahoma History & Culture

Further reading
Lyle H. Boren and Dale Boren, Who's Who in Oklahoma (Guthrie, Okla.: Cooperative Publishing Co., 1935).
Marion Gridley, American Indian Women (New York: Hawthorne Books, Inc., 1974).
Edward T. James, ed., Notable American Women, 1607–1950: A Biographical Dictionary (Cambridge, Mass.: Belknap Press of Harvard University Press, 1971).
Mary Hays Marable and Elaine Boylan, A Handbook of Oklahoma Writers (Norman: University of Oklahoma Press, 1939).
Luretta Rainey, History of Oklahoma State Federation of Women's Clubs (Guthrie, Okla: Cooperative Publishing Co., 1939).
Mildred W. Wells, Unity in Diversity: The History of the General Federation of Women's Clubs (Washington, D.C.: General Federation of Women's Clubs, 1953).

Native American activists
Women in Oklahoma politics
Lenape people
American people of Scottish descent
1878 births
1940 deaths
Clubwomen
20th-century Native Americans
20th-century Native American women